Beauvilliers (or Beauvillier) was the name of a very ancient French family belonging to the country around Chartres, members of which are found filling court offices from the 15th century onward.

 For Charles de Beauvillier, gentleman of the chamber to the king, governor and bailli of Blois, the estate of Saint-Aignan was created a countship in 1537.

Later, there were two ducs de Beauvilliers:
François de Beauvilliers, 1st duc de Saint-Aignan (1610–1687)
Paul de Beauvilliers, 2nd duc de Saint-Aignan (1648–1714), son of the former

Other members of the family included:
Antoine Beauvilliers, pastry chef to the future Louis XVIII and proprietor of the Grande Taverne de Londres
Paul-Hippolyte de Beauvilliers, duke of Saint-Aignan (1684–1776)

References

French-language surnames